Vittoria Archilei (La Romanina) (fl. 1582 – 1620) was an Italian singer, dancer, and lutenist. She was born Vittoria Concarini, but in 1582 married Antonio Archilei, a composer and lutenist. She was in the service of Ferdinando I de' Medici, Grand Duke of Tuscany, along with Emilio de' Cavalieri, who was her mentor. In 1588 she went with her husband and Cavalieri to the Medici court in Florence, where she became "one of the most famous singers of her time" (Grove). She is recorded as singing at many court entertainments and weddings up until 1620, and was in the service of the Medici her whole career. Many composers wrote for her, including Sebastian Raval and Luca Marenzio, as well as, of course, her husband and Cavalieri.

Giulio Caccini and Jacopo Peri claimed that she had sung their music, in order to help their claims to supremacy in composition, as well as to being the best writers in the seconda prattica style. Sigismondo d'India also wrote of her skill in singing. She apparently sang in the new style, including many ornaments and passaggi. She sang with Francesca Caccini and Settimia Caccini in an imitation of the concerto delle donne in Florence for a period.

References
H. Wiley Hitchcock, Tim Carter. "Vittoria Archilei", Grove Music Online, ed. L. Macy (accessed May 20, 2006), grovemusic.com (subscription access).

Italian women singers
16th-century births
17th-century deaths
17th-century Italian actresses
Italian stage actresses
17th-century Italian singers
Place of birth missing